Kimball is an 'L' station and the terminus of the CTA's Brown Line. It is located in Chicago's Albany Park neighborhood. During regular hours trains are scheduled to depart from Kimball every 7–10 minutes, and take about 33 minutes to reach the Loop.

The station and nearby Kimball Avenue are both named after Martin Kimbell, a 19th century farmer who owned land in the area that is today known as Logan Square.

There is an inside joke in the 1993 film The Fugitive when the main character Dr. Kimble boards a Kimball-Belmont 'L' train.

History

The original station at Kimball was constructed by the Northwestern Elevated Railroad and opened on December 14, 1907. This station was demolished and a new station built in its place in 1974. The newly opened station was used for filming for the 1975 film, Cooley High. The station has three tracks which are served by an island platform and a side platform; there is also a train storage yard and a workshop alongside the station.

Brown Line Capacity Expansion Project
Although Kimball Station was rebuilt in 1974 it was still upgraded as part of the Brown Line Capacity Expansion Project. The station closed from September 15, 2006 to January 12, 2007. During this closure, the two platforms were extended to support eight railcars, and the station entrance was reconfigured to better meet ADA requirements.

Bus connections
CTA
  81 Lawrence (Owl Service) 
  82 Kimball/Homan 
  93 California/Dodge (Monday–Saturday only)

References

External links 

 Kimball Station Page
 Train schedule (PDF) at CTA official site
 Lawrence Avenue entrance from Google Maps Street View

Albany Park, Chicago
CTA Brown Line stations
Chicago "L" terminal stations
Railway stations in the United States opened in 1907